Serge Dufoulon (15 April 1956 – 30 October 2022) was a French post-modern sociologist. He was also a blogger and former columnist on the RMC program .

Biography
Dufoulon earned a master's degree in rural sociology and a certificate in political science from the University of Provence and the University of the Mediterranean, respectively. After passing his Master of Advanced Studies at the School for Advanced Studies in the Social Sciences under the direction of Georges Condominas, he earned a doctorate in sociology and social sciences from Lumière University Lyon 2 in 1995.

Dufoulon became a professor of sociology and anthropology and chaired the sociology department at Pierre Mendès-France University. He was also an expert with AERES. He served as a columnist on the RMC show Les Grandes Gueules in 2012.

Serge Dufoulon died on 30 October 2022 at the age of 66.

Controversies
In 2016, Dufoulon was accused of making "inappropriate remarks" to three students during master's courses in sociology at Grenoble Alpes University, commenting "you see, the problem with you is that nobody wants to fuck you" and making other remarks on the physique of female students.

Dufoulon's lawyer "received a mandate to file a complaint for slanderous denunciation, against the signatories of the open letter who have a truncated and ideological vision" and announced that he was considering filing a complaint against the University for harassment. According to Place Gre’net, "the 'dissident' sociologists of Lestamp have asserted their support for the professor" in part by reproducing a blog post made on Dufoulon's Mediapart account.

Dufoulon submitted two appeals to the administrative court of Grenoble, considering himself a victim of moral harassment by the University. His appeals were dismissed.

Publications
Femmes de parole. Une ethnologie de la voyance (1997)
Les gars de la marine. Ethnologie d'un navire de guerre (1998)
Métissages (2001)
Sociologie du milieu militaire (2005)
Religious Frontiers of Europe, Eurolimes, Journal of the Institute for Eurogional Studies (2007)
Développement durable : Analyse sociologique de la domestication de l’environnement (2009)
Migrations, Mobilités, Frontières et Voisinages (2011)
Internet ou la boîte à usages (2012)
Europe partagée, Europe des partages (2013)
Itinéraire d'une grande gueule. Du Bled à l'Université (2015)
Les relations familiales dans les écritures de l'intime du XIXe français (2016)

References

1956 births
2022 deaths
French sociologists
French bloggers
People from Tunis
University of Lyon alumni
University of the Mediterranean alumni
School for Advanced Studies in the Social Sciences alumni
University of Provence alumni